The George Frisbie Hoar statue is a public monument in Worcester, Massachusetts, United States. Located on the north side of the Worcester City Hall, the monument honors George Frisbie Hoar, a politician from the city. The monument, which consists of a statue designed by Daniel Chester French, was dedicated in 1908.

History

Background 

George Frisbie Hoar was born in Concord, Massachusetts, United States on August 29, 1826. As a child, he attended Concord Academy, and in 1842, at the age of 16, he entered into Harvard College, graduating four years later. In 1849, he graduated from Harvard Law School and was admitted to the bar that same year, following which he began to practice law in Worcester, Massachusetts. During the 1850s, he served terms in both the Massachusetts House of Representatives and the Massachusetts Senate, and from 1869 to 1877, he served in the United States House of Representatives as a member of the Republican Party. In 1877, he became a U.S. Senator, a position he would hold until his death in Worcester in 1904.

Creation and dedication 
Following Hoar's death, on April 25, 1905, Worcester Mayor Walter H. Blodgett held a meeting at the city hall to discuss the creation of a memorial to Hoar. A memorial fund was created for this purpose, and on May 4, trustees of the fund were elected, with Blodgett as the fund's chairman. Fundraising through popular donations commenced, and within a few weeks, over 30,000 donors had contributed over $21,000 to the monument's creation. At a meeting held on July 20, sculptor Daniel Chester French was selected to design a statue of Hoar, with the pedestal to be designed by Peabody and Stearns and created by the Norcross Brothers. The location for the monument, the northern side of the Worcester City Hall, was selected by the trustees on January 16, 1908.

The statue was dedicated on June 26, 1908. The dedication ceremony began with a prayer given by Edward Everett Hale, followed by speeches given by Mayor James Logan and Massachusetts Governor Curtis Guild Jr., and an oration by Associate Justice of the U.S. Supreme Court William Henry Moody. The ceremony concluded with the playing of "America".

Design 
The monument consists of a bronze statue of Hoar atop a granite pedestal. Hoar is sitting in a chair, with an overcoat hanging over the left arm of the chair. In his other hand, Hoar is holding a manuscript. Several bronze tablets with inscriptions are affixed to the pedestal. The inscriptions read as follows:

See also 
 1908 in art
 Public sculptures by Daniel Chester French

References

Bibliography

External links 

 

1908 establishments in Massachusetts
1908 sculptures
Bronze sculptures in Massachusetts
Buildings and structures in Worcester, Massachusetts
Culture of Worcester, Massachusetts
Monuments and memorials in Massachusetts
Outdoor sculptures in Massachusetts
Sculptures by Daniel Chester French
Sculptures of men in Massachusetts
Statues in Massachusetts
Landmarks in Worcester, Massachusetts